Allodessus is a genus of beetles in the family Dytiscidae, containing the following species:

 Allodessus bistrigatus (Clark, 1862)
 Allodessus megacephalus (Gschwendtner, 1931)
 Allodessus oliveri (Ordish, 1966)
 Allodessus skottsbergi (Zimmermann, 1924)
 Allodessus thienemanni (Csiki, 1938)

References

Dytiscidae